Macgo Mac Blu-ray Player is a proprietary Blu-ray Disc media playing software, first released in 2011 by Macgo Inc. It provides playback functionality for Blu-ray Discs, DVDs, and other media formats for Mac and Microsoft Windows.  Free trial versions are available for both Mac and PC platforms. It is also a media player for playing Blu-ray Disc/Folder or ISO files on Windows 8.1/8/7/Vista/XP.

Features 
The only Mac Blu-ray software officially licensed by BDA
Supports Blu-ray Menu
Support for up to 5.1 channel surround decoding, or 7.1 passthrough to external decoder
HD audiovisual quality
Hardware accelerated playback
Support for discs from different regions
Multi-language support
Support for playback of Blu-ray DVD and CD titles from discs, ISO images, and folders
Support for Blu-ray Disc playback on iPhone/iPad/iPod Touch
Ability to share video information on Facebook and Twitter

Supported platforms 
 Intel Core 2 Duo 2.4GHz and equivalent, or Apple silicon arm
 Mac OS X 10.6 (Snow Leopard) - macOS 12.1 (macOS Monterey)
 Windows XP (SP2 or later) - Windows 10

Support formats 
 Video input: BD (Blu-ray Disc), Blu-ray ISO, DVD Video, Video CD, VCD, AVI, ASF, WMV, MP4, MOV, 3GP, Matroska (MKV), FLV (Flash), RMVB, Raw DV
 Audio input: WMA, WAV (including DTS), Audio CD (no DTS-CD), MPEG (ES, PS, TS, PVA, MP3), Raw Audio: DTS, AAC, AC3, A52
 Video output: X11, XVideo, SDL, FrameBuffer, ASCII Art
 Audio output: S/PDIF, Multi-channel, PulseAudio, PortAudio, JACK

Media Reviews 
 Archive from Tuaw
 Cnet
 Redmond Pie
 lifehacker
 Macworld
 iTWire
 Archive from electronista
 Macgo Software
 Conodi (in German)

References 

Blu-ray Disc
Software Blu-ray players